"BamKhel" in Urdu (بام خیل) is a village and Union Council of Swabi District in Khyber Pakhtunkhwa, Pakistan.

Bamkhel literally means the place on height. The village is mainly divided into different parts called "Mohalla" and "banda". There are total four mohallas in village Bamkhel. Details are given below:
 Mada Khel (mohalla)
 Jaffar Khel (The largest mohalla)
 Younas Khel (mohalla)
 Budla Khel (mohalla)
 Kachkol Banda
 Yousaf Abad
 Khabeer Banda
 Sherbaz Banda
 Mohammad Banda (kado laar)
 Mirza Khan Banda
 Bezad Banda (Jabar)
 Sharif Abad (Madakhel)

Demographics 
The literacy rate of BamKhel is very low at 29.7%, according to an official census conducted in 1998.

Education 
There is one Commerce college, one higher secondary school for boys and a high school for girls, three primary schools for boys and two primary schools for girls. In addition to government schools several private schools and colleges are also there.

Health 
There is only one dispensary in the village servicing around 30,000 inhabitants and also private medical stores.

References 

Populated places in Swabi District
Union Councils of Swabi District